Shir Manj (also Romanized as Shīr Manj and Shīr Meng; also known as Shīr Sang, Shīr Meng-e Pā’īn, Shīr Mahanj, and Shīrmeng Pā’īn) is a village in Baqeran Rural District, in the Central District of Birjand County, South Khorasan Province, Iran. At the 2006 census, its population was 61, in 15 families.

References 

Populated places in Birjand County